Al Abdullah and Al Hisham is a sub-district located in At Taffah District, Al Bayda Governorate, Yemen. Al Abdullah and Al Hisham had a population of 5530 according to the 2004 census.

References 

Sub-districts in At Taffah District